Under the Cards (French: Le dessous des cartes) is a 1948 French crime film directed by André Cayatte and starring Madeleine Sologne, Serge Reggiani and Paul Meurisse. The story is loosely based on the Stavisky Affair of the 1930s. A separate Italian-language version Manù il contrabbandiere was also produced.

The film's sets were designed by the art director René Moulaert.

Cast
 Madeleine Sologne as Florence Géraudy  
 Serge Reggiani as Manu  
 Paul Meurisse as Inspecteur Nansen  
 Enrico Glori as Claude Géraudy  
 René Bourbon as Docteur Pierre  
 Léonce Corne as Le juge  
 Paul Faivre as Le maire  
 André Carnège as Welford  
 Gabrielle Fontan as La mère de Florence  
 Paul Demange as Le speaker  
 René Blancard as Le brigadier 
 Édouard Delmont as L'aubergiste  
 Janine Darcey as Fine

References

Bibliography 
 Crisp, C.G. The Classic French Cinema, 1930-1960. Indiana University Press, 1993.

External links 
 

1948 films
French crime films
1948 crime films
1940s French-language films
Films directed by André Cayatte
French black-and-white films
1940s French films